Thirumukkulam (തിരുമുക്കുളം വില്ലേജ് ) is a village in Thrissur district in the state of Kerala, India.

Demographics
 India census, Thirumukkulam had a population of 9123 with 4448 males and 4675 females.

References

Villages in Thrissur district